The  is a Japanese cherry tree in Kodaira, Tokyo, Japan originally planted by Nitta Yoshisada in the year 1333.

History 
Tradition has it that in the year 1333 when Nitta Yoshisada was conducting the Kōzuke-Musashi Campaign and on his way to conquer Kamakura, he was leading his army south on the Kamakura Kaido. He is said to have planted a cherry tree to act as a guidepost. Cherry trees were subsequently replanted over the years, the most recent being planted in 1980.

References
 Signpost at site posted created in May 1991 by the Kodaira Board of Education

Tourist attractions in Tokyo
Western Tokyo